, also written as , is a Japanese monthly shōnen manga magazine. Published by Shueisha, the magazine premiered on November 2, 2007 as a replacement for Monthly Shōnen Jump, another manga anthology that Shueisha discontinued in June of that year. The magazine is a part of the Jump line of magazines. The manga titles serialized in the magazine are also published in tankōbon volumes under the Jump Comics SQ. imprint. Shueisha reported from their sales pole that readers of Jump Square tend to range from 15 to 34 years of age. The current (2015) editor-in-chief is Kôsuke Yahagi.

History 
Jump SQ, also called Jump Square, was created as the replacement for Shueisha's canceled Monthly Shōnen Jump manga anthology. The title has three stated meanings: public square ("a plaza where comic lovers and talented artists and writers come together"), algebraic square (Weekly Shōnen Jump²), and "SQ = Supreme Quality" (referring to its "Supreme Quality Manga Magazine" motto). Four manga serials were temporarily moved to Weekly Shōnen Jump, until Jump Square's release. These four series, Tegami Bachi, Rosario + Vampire, Claymore, and Gag Manga Biyori were among the magazine's premiere series, along with debuting series, including Embalming -The Another Tale of Frankenstein-, Kure-nai, and Dragonaut: The Resonance.

Circulation
When Jump Square was launched, the initial printing of 500,000 copies quickly sold out. Over 70% of the copies released across Japan sold  within three days. Shueisha printed an additional 100,000 copies to help meet the demand, something normally not necessary with Japanese magazines. The second issue also sold well, requiring a second printing of 60,000 copies. After the first issue excitement died down, circulation leveled off in the vicinity of 370,000 copies and by 2015 had declined to 270,000, mirroring a general drop-off in circulation throughout the industry.

Features 
Jump Square's primary content is manga serials. In addition to the manga series, some issues include serialized light novel chapters from works published by the Jump j-Books label.

Series

There are currently twenty-one manga titles being regularly serialized in Jump Square.

Special issues

Jump SQ.II 

The first issue featured the collaborative effort between American comic writer Stan Lee and Hiroyuki Takei, called Karakuri Dôji Ultimo (using the Marvel Method).

A contest organized by Shonen Jump (a monthly English version of Weekly Shōnen Jump) and Jump SQ., offered a Jump SQ II (Second) issue autographed by Lee and Takei to the random winner at the 2008 New York Comic Con. Three regulars: Sekai no Chūshin de Taiyō ni Hoeru, Tsumikabatsu, and Mahō no Ryōri Chaos Kitchen; were put in the SQ II magazine as their own SQ II exclusive one-shot, along with other one-shots like Missing Battery, Cross, or Alone Again.

The success of Ultimo led to the extra mini book named  which is completely based on Lee's American comics, mostly Amazing Fantasy (first Spider-Man, Iron Man, and The Hulk.

Jump SQ.19 
 is a spin-off issue of Jump SQ, first published on May 19, 2010. It includes one shots and Jump SQ series' side stories, and a series that only serializes in Jump SQ.19. Initially, it was scheduled to release quarterly on the 19th of every February, May, August, and November.

On February 18, 2012, Jump SQ.19 announced a magazine changed to a bimonthly release. It was then published on the 19th of every even-numbered month until its publication ceased on February 19, 2015.

Jump SQ.Crown 
 was a spin-off issue of Jump SQ which started publishing on July 17, 2015. It followed a structure similar to Jump SQ.19: the series which only serialize in Jump SQ.Crown; the one-shots by newbies and experienced authors; and the side stories from Jump SQ. series. It ceased publication on January 19, 2018.

Jump SQ.Lab 
 is a spin-off issue of Jump SQ, first published on July 15, 2011. Jump SQ.Lab follows same format as Jump Next; it includes the one shots by both the experienced and the newcomer manga creators, and the side stories for both Jump SQ and Jump SQ.19 series.

Jump SQ.Rise 
 is a spin-off issue of Jump SQ which started publishing on April 13, 2018. It follows a structure similar to Jump SQ.19 and Jump SQ Crown.

Series 
There are currently four manga titles being regularly serialized in Jump SQ.Rise.

References

External links 
Official Jump Square website 
Shūeisha S-Manga.Net Jump Square website 
 

2007 establishments in Japan
Monthly manga magazines published in Japan
Magazines established in 2007
Shōnen manga magazines
Shueisha magazines